Under Crimson Skies is a 1920 American silent adventure film directed by Rex Ingram and starring Elmo Lincoln, Harry von Meter and Mabel Ballin. There are no known archival holdings of the film, so it is presumably a lost film.

Cast
 Elmo Lincoln as Captain Yank Barstow 
 Harry von Meter as Vance Clayton 
 Mabel Ballin as Helen Clayton 
 Nancy Caswell as Peg Clayton 
 Frank Brownlee as Dead Sight Burke 
 Paul Weigel as Plum Duff Hargis 
 Dick La Reno as Second Mate 
 Noble Johnson as Baltimore Bucko 
 Beatrice Dominguez as Island Girl 
 Ethel Irving

References

Bibliography
 Leonhard Gmür. Rex Ingram: Hollywood's Rebel of the Silver Screen. 2013.

External links
 

1920 films
1920 adventure films
American silent feature films
American adventure films
Films directed by Rex Ingram
American black-and-white films
Universal Pictures films
1920 lost films
Lost American films
Lost adventure films
1920s English-language films
1920s American films
Silent adventure films
Silent romance films